
Year 281 BC was a year of the pre-Julian Roman calendar. At the time it was known as the Year of the Consulship of Barbula and Philippus (or, less frequently, year 473 Ab urbe condita). The denomination 281 BC for this year has been used since the early medieval period, when the Anno Domini calendar era became the prevalent method in Europe for naming years.

Events 
 By place 
 Asia Minor 
 The Battle of Corupedium in Lydia is the last battle of the Diadochi, the rival successors to Alexander the Great. It is fought between the armies of Lysimachus, King of Thrace, Macedonia, Western Anatolia and Seleucus, ruler of Eastern Anatolia, Syria, Phoenicia, Judea, Babylonia and Iran. Seleucus kills Lysimachus during the battle.
 Following the Battle of Corupedium, Lysimachus' widow, Arsinoe, flees to Cassandrea, a city in northern Greece, where she marries her half-brother Ptolemy Keraunos. This proves to be a serious misjudgement, as Ptolemy Keraunus promptly kills two of her sons, though the third is able to escape. Arsinoe flees again, this time to Alexandria in Egypt.

 Greece 
 Seleucus takes over Thrace and then tries to seize Macedonia. However, he falls into a trap near Lysimachia, Thrace, set by Ptolemy Keraunos, one of the sons of Ptolemy I and Arsinoe II's half brother, who murders Seleucus and takes Macedonia for himself.
 Cineas, a Thessalian serving as chief adviser to King Pyrrhus of Epirus, after visiting Rome attempts, without success, to dissuade Pyrrhus from invading southern Italy.

 Seleucid Empire 
 Seleucus is succeeded as ruler of the Seleucid empire by Antiochus. He is immediately beset by revolts in Syria (probably instigated by Ptolemy II of Egypt) and by independence movements in northern Anatolia.
 Although he has only a few bases in Greece, Antigonus II Gonatas lays claim to Macedonia. His claim is disputed by Antiochus I.

Births 
 Zhuangxiang of Qin, Chinese king of the Qin State (d. 247 BC)

Deaths 
 Lysimachus, king of Thrace and Macedonia (b. c. 360 BC)
 Seleucus I Nicator, founder of the Seleucid Empire (b. c. 354 BC)

References